"The Lovely Linda" is a song by English musician Paul McCartney, released as the opening track of his debut solo album, McCartney, in April 1970. McCartney wrote the song to his first wife, Linda McCartney.

History
Paul McCartney wrote "The Lovely Linda" in Scotland during 1969, when he and wife Linda McCartney were living at their farm, High Park, in Campbeltown. The song is dedicated to McCartney's first wife and was a reply-of-sorts to Beatles bandmate John Lennon's public declarations of love for his wife, Yoko Ono. "The Lovely Linda" was released as the opening track on McCartney's eponymous debut solo album, and was the first song taped for the album. McCartney recorded the composition shortly before Christmas in December 1969, in order to test his then-new 4-track recorder, which he had installed in his home studio in London.

At 42 seconds, it is the shortest song in McCartney's solo catalogue. The recording features him on all instruments, including what authors Chip Madinger and Mark Easter term "percussive handslaps on a book", and ends with the sound of laughter. On release in April 1970, McCartney stated that "The Lovely Linda" was a "trailer to the full song which will be recorded in the future", but he has yet to release a more complete version. The song appeared on the 2001 compilation Wingspan: Hits and History.

Reception
In a review for the McCartney album, Langdon Winner of Rolling Stone described "The Lovely Linda", along with "That Would Be Something", as having "virtually no verbal or melodic content whatsoever."

George Harrison disregarded the song during an interview in 1970, stating: "'That Would Be Something' and 'Maybe I'm Amazed' I think are great and everything else I think is fair, you know. It's quite good, but a little disappointing, but maybe I shouldn't be disappointed, it's best not to expect anything, then everything's a bonus. I think those two tracks are very good and the others just don't do anything for me."

Personnel
 Paul McCartney – lead vocals, guitar, bass, hand percussion
Personnel per The Beatles Bible.

References

Sources

 
 
 
 
 

Paul McCartney songs
Songs written by Paul McCartney
Song recordings produced by Paul McCartney
1970 songs
Music published by MPL Music Publishing
Linda McCartney